Ivar Vivahitharayal ? is a 2009 Malayalam language comedy drama film starring Jayasurya, Bhama, and Samvrutha Sunil in leading roles. Navya Nair appears in a cameo role in the film as Jayasurya's dream wife. The film is the directorial debut of Saji Surendran, who has been a television serial director.
The movie had a dream run at the box office.

Plot

Vivek (Jayasurya) is getting his MBA  from Pondicherry University. Even while as a student, he is eager is to get married as soon as he returns home after his studies. Vivek has a very close circle of four friends, with whom he discusses everything.  Prominent among these friends is Treesa (Samvrutha Sunil). Treesa and other friends advise Vivek not to get married so early and until he finds a job, but Vivek had already made up his mind.

Vivek's parents, Adv. Ananthan Menon (Siddique) and Adv. Nandini (Rekha) live separated at adjacent flats in the same building. Vivek returns home during holidays and stays at each of his parents apartments on alternate days. He loves his parents very much and wishes to unite them. A spoiled brat, Vivek, is addressed as Ananthuttan by his father Ananthan and Nanduttan by his mother Nandini.

Suraj Venjarammoodu plays the role of Adv. Mannanthala Susheel Kumar, an assistant advocate to Adv. Ananthan Menon.

Vivek's encounter through a phone-in programme with Kavya aka Tinky (Bhama), a radio jockey, results in loss of her job. Some strange circumstances lead to Vivek and Kavya getting married, without realizing that they are the same people who clashed on the FM radio channel. Vivek assumed that Kavya was an orthodox and simple wife of his dreams, however, she turns out to be otherwise. Vivek discovers on the first night of their marriage, that he was the reason that Kavya lost her job at the FM station. Vivek decided to reveal the truth to Kavya some time in the future but he couldn't. Kavya gets rejected at other FM channels due to the notorious happening at her previous FM station.

Vivek finds that he did not pass his MBA exam and a subsequent quarrel with his father, leads to him getting thrown out of his father's house. Vivek, now out of his own house, is without a job or money to survive. Treesa helps Vivek and Kavya rent a house next to Treesa's. Vivek finds difficult carrying out his responsibilities as an husband but he is in denial about that.

Kavya doubts Treesa's friendliness towards Vivek  results in quarrels  between them. She is also worried of Vivek's lack of responsibilities and care for her feelings. Kavya also discovers from Treesa that it was the because of Vivek, she had lost her earlier job. Kavya decides to leave for her own house. However, she promises to stay with him and Vivek's parents who are reunited now.

After a month, Vivek and Kavya file a joint divorce petition at the court. Vivek redoes his MBA exam and passes in it which made his parents very happy. Vivek plans to leave for Dubai, but they discover their emotions towards each other at the end of the film and all is well now.

Cast

Jayasurya as Vivek Ananthan/Ananthuttan/Nanduttan
Bhama as Kavya
Samvrutha Sunil as Treesa
Siddique as Adv. Ananthan Menon
Rekha as Adv. Nandini Ananthan
Nedumudi Venu as Freddy Uncle
Suraj Venjarammoodu as Adv. Mannanthala Susheel Kumar
Devan as Treesa's father
 Baby Raihana as Annamma
Kalaranjini as Lakshmi, Kavya's mother
Mallika Sukumaran as Treesa's mother
Shaju as Broker
Anoop Menon as Ajay Menon, manager of Club FM channel (Special Appearance)
Suresh Krishna as manager of MIF Group (Special Appearance)
Babu Swamy
K. B. Ganesh Kumar as Jeevan, Freddy Uncle's son (Cameo appearance)
Navya Nair as herself (Special Appearance)

Production
Mahadevan Thampi is the still photographer of this movie.

Soundtrack

 "Enikku Padanoru" - Sainoj
 "Poomukha Vathilkal" - Vijay Yesudas
 "Sunday Sooryan" - Tippu, Anand Narayan, Vipin Saviour, Sooraj, Charu Hariharan
 "Pazhmulam Thandil" - Ratheesh

Box office
The film grossed 90 lakhs from its first week in Kerala box office. The film was commercial success.

References

External links
 

2009 films
2000s Malayalam-language films
2009 directorial debut films
Films scored by M. Jayachandran
Films directed by Saji Surendran